Sablé-sur-Sarthe (literally Sablé on Sarthe), commonly referred to as Sablé, is a commune in the Sarthe department, in the Pays de la Loire region, western France. It is about 50 km northeast of Angers.

Population

Geography
The Vaige forms part of the commune's north-western border, flows southwards through the middle of the commune, then flows into the Sarthe River in the town of Sablé-sur-Sarthe.

History
French prime minister François Fillon was mayor of Sablé from 1983 to 2001, which therefore has a TGV station on the line from Paris-Nantes despite a relatively small population.

Tourism
The town is a hub for river cruising along the Sarthe. There is a festival of baroque music every August.

Industry
From 2010 to 2015, the motor car firm Venturi had a factory at Sablé-sur-Sarthe.

Points of interest
 Arboretum du Rosay

See also
 Communes of the Sarthe department
 Sablé-sur-Sarthe hostage crisis

References

External links

 Town council website
 

Communes of Sarthe
Maine (province)